Kemerovo fire may refer to:

2018 Kemerovo fire
2022 Kemerovo nursing home fire